Club Atlético Juventud Unida Universitario is an Argentine football club from San Luis Province. The team currently plays in Torneo Argentino A, the regionalised third division of the Argentine football league system.

Titles
Torneo Argentino B: 1
 2000–01

Managers
 Pablo Marini (2012)

External links
Official website
Juventud Unida Universitario Results

 
Juventud Unida
Association football clubs established in 1976